Panionios G.S.S. FC (Greek: ΠΑΕ Πανιώνιος Γ.Σ.Σ.), or with its full name Panionios Gymnastikos Syllogos Smyrnis (Greek: Πανιώνιος Γυμναστικός Σύλλογος Σμύρνης, Pan-Ionian Gymnastics Club of Smyrna) is a Greek association football club based in Nea Smyrni suburb of Athens. During the 2016-17 campaign they will be competing in the following competitions: Super League, Greek Cup.

Competitions

Super League

League table

Results summary

Results by matchday

Play-offs table

Matches

References

External links
Official football club website
Official basketball club website

Panionios F.C. seasons
Panionios